The 2013–14 NBL Indonesia is the fourth season of NBL Indonesia, a nationwide basketball competition which previously known as Indonesian Basketball League (IBL).

Participating teams
 Satya Wacana Metro Bandung
 Aspac Jakarta
 Stadium Jakarta
 Bima Sakti Malang
 CLS Knights
 Garuda Speedy Bandung
 Muba Hang Tuah
 Pelita Jaya Energi Mega Persada
 SM BritAma
 BSC Bandung Utama
 NSH GMC Riau
 Pacific Caesar

Competition format
Participating teams compete in the regular season using home tournament format. The regular season divided into 6 series, each with different host cities. The top teams in final overall standings will continue to the championship playoffs.

There is also a pre-season warm-up tournament held before the regular season.

Regular season

Standings

Statistics leaders

Individual statistic leaders

References

2013-14
2013–14 in Asian basketball leagues
NBL